"Wise Man" is a song by British rock band Uriah Heep. The song was written by Ken Hensley and Jack Williams for their album Firefly, which was released in February 1977. The song is also the first UK single with the band's new vocalist John Lawton. "Wise Man" was recorded at Roundhouse Recording Studios in London during October and November 1976, and was written in the key of A major.

Personnel
 Mick Box – guitar
 Ken Hensley – keyboards
 Lee Kerslake – drums
 Trevor Bolder – bass guitar
 John Lawton – lead vocals

References

External links

1977 singles
Uriah Heep (band) songs
Songs written by Ken Hensley
1976 songs
Bronze Records singles